Timothy Pitts (born December 11, 1981) is a sailor who represented the United States Virgin Islands. He competed in the Laser event at the 2004 Summer Olympics.

References

External links
 
 

1981 births
Living people
United States Virgin Islands male sailors (sport)
Olympic sailors of the United States Virgin Islands
Sailors at the 2004 Summer Olympics – Laser
People from Saint Croix, U.S. Virgin Islands